Salaam Mumbai (known as Hello Mumbai) is a 2016 Iranian-Indian drama film directed by Ghorban Mohammadpour. The film stars Iranian actor Mohammad Reza Golzar and Indian actress Dia Mirza in the leading roles.

Box office
In Iran, the film surpassed the opening record of Asghar Farhadi's Academy Award winning film, The Salesman (2016). Salaam Mumbai grossed 10billion rials ($260,000) in two days, surpassing the previous record of The Salesman, which grossed the same amount in three days. Salaam Mumbais final gross in Iran was 146billion rials.

References

External links
 

2016 films
2016 drama films
2010s Persian-language films
2010s Hindi-language films
Films shot in Mumbai
Indian multilingual films
Iranian multilingual films 
2016 multilingual films
Films shot in Iran
Films shot in Tehran
Films set in Mumbai